George's Quay is a street and quay in Dublin on the southern bank of the River Liffey. It is located between Burgh Quay and Hawkins Street to the west, and City Quay and Talbot Memorial Bridge to the east.

History and development
Though earlier land-reclamation along the Liffey's south-eastern banks had allowed for construction in the area, as evidenced by the quay's name, its current layout derives from Dublin's "Georgian" development period in the 18th century. Most remaining buildings on the quay however date from 19th and (predominantly) 20th century construction. Into the 21st century, a number of entities have published plans for increased development in the area - including Dublin City Council (in 2008) and Córas Iompair Éireann (in 2015).

Current use

Commercial
The quay is fronted primarily by George's Quay Plaza - a complex of buildings located between Hawkins street and Lombard Street. Along with the wider IFSC area, It is sometimes jokingly referred to as "Canary Dwarf" in reference to Canary Wharf in London. Completed in 2002, it was designed by KMD Architecture, and houses the headquarters of Ulster Bank. Initial plans for the development by Irish Life dated from the 1980s.

Transport
Tara Street railway station is on the quay close to the junctions with Butt Bridge and Tara Street. It is one of the busiest commuter rail stations in Dublin. Dublin Bus and a number of commercial operators also have bus-stops along the quay.

References

Streets in Dublin (city)
Georges Quay Plaza
Quays in Dublin (city)
Office buildings in the Republic of Ireland
Skyscrapers in the Republic of Ireland